Salix futura is a species of willow native to central Japan. It is a deciduous large shrub, reaching a height of 2 m.

References 

futura
Flora of Japan